Eddie Keizan (12 September 1944 – 21 May 2016) was a South African racing driver.  He raced in three World Championship Formula One Grands Prix during the 1970s, debuting on 3 March 1973.  He scored no championship points.

Keizan was born in Johannesburg. After success in South Africa driving saloons and sports cars, Keizan moved into Formula 5000 where he won the national championship.  He participated in the South African Formula One championships as well, including three World Championship South African Grands Prix, twice with a Tyrrell owned by Alex Blignaut – this car had been previously raced by Jackie Stewart. For the third of his three attempts, Keizan drove a Lotus 72, entered by local outfit Team Gunston.

After Formula One, Keizan raced in touring cars and also concentrated on his business interests, including a successful alloy wheels company, TSW Alloy Wheels formally known as Tiger Sports Wheels.

Complete Formula One World Championship results
(key)

References

External links
Profile at grandprix.com

1944 births
2016 deaths
South African racing drivers
South African Formula One drivers
Team Gunston Formula One drivers
Sportspeople from Johannesburg